The LVG C.II was a 1910s German two-seat reconnaissance biplane designed at the Luft-Verkehrs-Gesellschaft for the Luftstreitkräfte.

Development
The C.II was developed from the LVG B.I, with the pilot and observer positions reversed, adding a ring-mounted machine gun to the rear. The increase in weight required a larger engine, the Benz Bz.III. Few C.I's were built before the C.II was introduced. It incorporated structural improvements and a more powerful engine.

Operational history
The C.IV was the first fixed-wing aircraft to bomb London, when six bombs were dropped near Victoria station on 28 November 1916.  (The first air raid on London was by the Zeppelin LZ 38, in the early hours of 1 June 1915.)

Variants
LVG C.I - initial design, 120 kW (160 hp) Benz Bz.III engine.
LVG C.II - production version.
LVG C.III - single experimental aircraft, observer and machine gun moved to front.
LVG C.IV - slightly larger, 160 kW (220 hp) Mercedes D.IV engine.

Operators

Luftstreitkrafte
Kaiserliche Marine

Swiss Air Force

Specifications (C.II)

See also

Notes

References

 Donald, David, The Encyclopedia of World Aircraft (pg 553). (1997). Prospero Books. 
 van Wyngarden, G (2006). Early German Aces of World War I, Osprey Publishing Ltd. 

1910s German military reconnaissance aircraft
Biplanes
Single-engined tractor aircraft
C.II
Aircraft first flown in 1915